Mordellistena serraticornis is a species of beetle in the genus Mordellistena of the family Mordellidae. It was described by Jan Horák in 1991.

References

Beetles described in 1991
serraticornis